Petronijević is a Croatian and Serbian surname. It can refer to:
 Avram Petronijević (1791–1852), Serbian politician
 Branislav Petronijević (1875–1954), Serbian philosopher and paleontologist
 Dušan Petronijević (born 1983), Serbian footballer
 Mateja Petronijević (born 1986), Croatian sailor
 Daniel (Dan) Petronijevic (born 1981), Serbian-Canadian actor

Croatian surnames
Serbian surnames